This is a list of elections to the Senedd (Welsh Parliament; ; formerly the National Assembly of Wales until May 2020), the devolved legislature of Wales. These elections have been held regularly since its establishment in 1999. The elections were held every four years from 1999, but were increased to five years following the Wales Act 2014 for the 2016 election.

Senedd (2020–) 

The first election since the renaming of the devolved legislature as the Senedd was held on Thursday 6 May 2021.

Next Senedd election
2021 Senedd election

National Assembly for Wales (1999–2020) 

2016 National Assembly for Wales election
2011 National Assembly for Wales election
2007 National Assembly for Wales election
2003 National Assembly for Wales election
1999 National Assembly for Wales election

 
Senedd